Momentum is the ninth solo album by guitarist Steve Hackett.  It is Hackett's second album consisting mainly of classical guitar pieces.  Hackett's younger brother, John, plays the flute on the album.  The album was re-released on Hackett's Camino Records label in 2001, with three bonus tracks.

Track listing
All songs written by Steve Hackett, except where indicated.
"Cavalcanti" – 6:13
"The Sleeping Sea" – 3:27
"Portrait of a Brazilian Lady" – 5:15
"When the Bell Breaks" – 3:03
"A Bed, A Chair and a Guitar" (Steve Hackett, traditional) – 2:44
"Concert for Munich" – 4:55
"Last Rites of Innocence" – 5:28
"Troubled Spirit" – 2:30
"Variation on a Theme by Chopin" – 4:55
"Pierrot" – 2:53
"Momentum" – 2:38

1994 bonus tracks
"Bourée" (Johann Sebastian Bach) – 1:34
"An Open Window" – 9:02
"The Vigil" – 6:19

Personnel
Steve Hackett – guitars, keyboards
John Hackett – flute

References

1988 albums
Steve Hackett albums